Jang Suk-won  (born August 11, 1989) is a South Korean football who plays as defender.

Club career

Kedah
On 16 December 2021, Jang Suk-Won agreed to join Malaysia Super League side Kedah Darul Aman.

Injured and decided to retire.

Career statistics

External links

References 

1989 births
Living people
Association football fullbacks
South Korean footballers
Seongnam FC players
Gimcheon Sangmu FC players
K League 1 players
K League 2 players
Dankook University alumni
Asian Games medalists in football
Footballers at the 2010 Asian Games
Asian Games bronze medalists for South Korea
Medalists at the 2010 Asian Games
Melaka United F.C. players